Adam Simpson (born 16 February 1976) is a former Australian rules footballer who is the current premiership coach of the West Coast Eagles in the Australian Football League (AFL). A left-footed midfielder, his playing career for  spanned from 1995 to 2009, where he played 306 games.

From Melbourne, Simpson played junior football for Eltham and the Northern Knights before being recruited to North Melbourne at the 1993 National Draft. He made his debut during the 1995 season, and won a premiership the following year, during which he was also nominated for the AFL Rising Star award. Another premiership followed in 1999, and in 2002, Simpson was named in the All-Australian team and also won North Melbourne's best and fairest award, the Syd Barker Medal. He was appointed club captain in 2004, and held the position until stepping down at the end of the 2008 season, with his span including a preliminary final in 2007. Simpson played his 300th game in 2009, the third North Melbourne player to do so, and finished his career towards the end of the season. He was appointed coach of West Coast in October 2013, replacing John Worsfold.

Early life

Simpson grew up in the northern suburbs of Melbourne where he played junior football for Eltham in the suburban Diamond Valley Football League. He also played under-18 football for Northern Knights.  Simpson also had a stint in the East Gippsland town of Sale where he was part of an under 15's premiership under coach Vince Moro.

As a child, Simpson supported the Carlton Football Club, the club whom he would play his final AFL game against in 2009.

Playing career

North Melbourne

1995–2009

Simpson was recruited by North Melbourne at the 1993 National Draft. He made his senior debut for the club against the Eagles in round 18 at Princes Park during the 1995 season. The following season, he played for North Melbourne in the 1996 AFL Grand Final win over Sydney. Earlier in the season, he was nominated for the Rising Star award. Simpson also played a key midfield role for North Melbourne when the team won the 1999 Grand Final. In 2002, he won the club best and fairest award (Syd Barker Medal) and he was named in the All-Australian team.

club captain (2004–2008)

Simpson was appointed club captain in 2004, and he led the Kangaroos into the finals the following year.

In 2005, the skipper narrowly missed recording a fifth consecutive top-three finish in the club best and fairest. He finished 4th, one vote behind 3rd and 2 votes shy of second. That year he missed two games with a punctured lung, but he still tallied over 400 disposals for the season with his industrious playmaking style.

Round 5, 2007, he racked up a career equalling high 41 disposals, including a goal, in the Roos 16 point win against Geelong at Kardinia Park. Weeks later, he played his 250th game against Carlton in a home game at Carrara on the Gold Coast. North Melbourne won the game 22-13 (147) to 20-10 (130). Simpson had 20 disposals. At the end of the game, his teammates celebrated his 250 milestone by chairlifting him from the field.

On 5 November 2008, Adam Simpson announced he was stepping down as captain but he would continue playing in 2009. Brent Harvey became the new captain.

Controversy

In April 2009. Simpson, Daniel Pratt and five other North Melbourne players admitted to producing a YouTube video entitled "The Adventures of Little Boris". The video was of a rubber chicken named Boris performing sexual acts on the carcass of a chicken. Simpson and Pratt were fined $5000 each by North Melbourne.

Retirement
Simpson retired during the 2009 season. With North Melbourne out of finals contention, Simpson announced his retirement on 27 July 2009. He played the last of his 306 games on Friday night against Carlton in round 18 at Docklands on 31 July He ended his playing career after 15 seasons in the same round he made his debut. Simpson played every game during the North Melbourne 1996 and 1999 premiership seasons, and during his career he missed seven games as a regular player. He was the third player to notch 300 games for North Melbourne.

Simpson played for North Melbourne Football Club from 1995 until 2009 for a total of 306 games and kicked 83 goals.

Coaching career

Hawthorn Football Club assistant coach (2010-2013)
After his retirement from his playing career at the end of the 2009 season, Simpson began his coaching career as an assistant coach under senior coach Alastair Clarkson at Hawthorn in the 2010 AFL season,  and he was the midfield & forward coach for the Hawks when the club won the premiership in the 2013 AFL Grand Final.

West Coast Eagles senior coach (2014-present)
In October 2013, the West Coast Eagles appointed Simpson as senior coach for the 2014 season. He replaced John Worsfold who stood down after a disappointing 2013 season. Simpson was selected ahead of applicants Scott Burns, Leigh Tudor and Peter Sumich. In his first year as senior coach, the Eagles under Simpson finished 9th at the end of the 2014 AFL season, just missing out of the finals. The following year in the 2015 AFL season, Simpson and the Eagles surprised many commentators by their performance when the club finished 2nd at the end home & away rounds. Simpson then coached the West Coast Eagles to the 2015 AFL Grand Final, which they fell short and lost to Hawthorn by a margin of 46 points with the final score Hawthorn 16.11 (107) to West Coast Eagles	8.13 (61).

In the following two seasons the Eagles made the finals, bowing out in the elimination final and the semi-final in 2016 and 2017 respectively.

In Round 2, 2018 against Western Bulldogs at Docklands Stadium, West Coast Eagles forwards coach Jaymie Graham served as caretaker coach of the team after Simpson was forced to return to Perth due to a family health drama.

In the 2018 AFL season, Simpson coached the West Coast Eagles to a premiership victory in the 2018 AFL Grand Final, when West Coast Eagles defeated Collingwood by a margin of five points, with the final score West Coast Eagles 11.13 (79) to Collingwood 11.8 (74).

Statistics

Playing statistics

|- style="background-color: #EAEAEA"
! scope="row" style="text-align:center" | 1995
|style="text-align:center;"|
| 37 || 2 || 0 || 0 || 5 || 6 || 11 || 1 || 1 || 0.0 || 0.0 || 2.5 || 3.0 || 5.5 || 0.5 || 0.5 || 0
|-
! scope="row" style="text-align:center" | 1996
|style="text-align:center;"|
| 37 || 25 || 16 || 8 || 164 || 94 || 258 || 46 || 35 || 0.6 || 0.3 || 6.6 || 3.8 || 10.3 || 1.8 || 1.4 || 0
|- style="background-color: #EAEAEA"
! scope="row" style="text-align:center" | 1997
|style="text-align:center;"|
| 37 || 19 || 5 || 7 || 153 || 82 || 235 || 46 || 23 || 0.3 || 0.4 || 8.1 || 4.3 || 12.4 || 2.4 || 1.2 || 0
|-
! scope="row" style="text-align:center" | 1998
|style="text-align:center;"|
| 37 || 19 || 9 || 10 || 175 || 112 || 287 || 46 || 45 || 0.5 || 0.5 || 9.2 || 5.9 || 15.1 || 2.4 || 2.4 || 0
|- style="background-color: #EAEAEA"
! scope="row" style="text-align:center" | 1999
|style="text-align:center;"|
| 7 || 25 || 5 || 9 || 409 || 136 || 545 || 113 || 54 || 0.2 || 0.4 || 16.4 || 5.4 || 21.8 || 4.5 || 2.2 || 7
|-
! scope="row" style="text-align:center" | 2000
|style="text-align:center;"|
| 7 || 25 || 5 || 6 || 376 || 116 || 492 || 87 || 83 || 0.2 || 0.2 || 15.0 || 4.6 || 19.7 || 3.5 || 3.3 || 0
|- style="background-color: #EAEAEA"
! scope="row" style="text-align:center" | 2001
|style="text-align:center;"|
| 7 || 21 || 3 || 0 || 309 || 146 || 455 || 88 || 60 || 0.1 || 0.0 || 14.7 || 7.0 || 21.7 || 4.2 || 2.9 || 2
|-
! scope="row" style="text-align:center" | 2002
|style="text-align:center;"|
| 7 || 23 || 7 || 10 || 403 || 162 || 565 || 105 || 72 || 0.3 || 0.4 || 17.5 || 7.0 || 24.6 || 4.6 || 3.1 || 7
|- style="background-color: #EAEAEA"
! scope="row" style="text-align:center" | 2003
|style="text-align:center;"|
| 7 || 21 || 11 || 6 || 327 || 205 || 532 || 126 || 45 || 0.5 || 0.3 || 15.6 || 9.8 || 25.3 || 6.0 || 2.1 || 9
|-
! scope="row" style="text-align:center" | 2004
|style="text-align:center;"|
| 7 || 22 || 4 || 8 || 317 || 227 || 544 || 118 || 73 || 0.2 || 0.4 || 14.4 || 10.3 || 24.7 || 5.4 || 3.3 || 10
|- style="background-color: #EAEAEA"
! scope="row" style="text-align:center" | 2005
|style="text-align:center;"|
| 7 || 21 || 3 || 1 || 230 || 183 || 413 || 84 || 63 || 0.1 || 0.0 || 11.0 || 8.7 || 19.7 || 4.0 || 3.0 || 7
|-
! scope="row" style="text-align:center" | 2006
|style="text-align:center;"|
| 7 || 19 || 2 || 2 || 226 || 210 || 436 || 96 || 58 || 0.1 || 0.1 || 11.9 || 11.1 || 22.9 || 5.1 || 3.1 || 3
|- style="background-color: #EAEAEA"
! scope="row" style="text-align:center" | 2007
|style="text-align:center;"|
| 7 || 25 || 4 || 4 || 327 || 283 || 610 || 104 || 110 || 0.2 || 0.2 || 13.1 || 11.3 || 24.4 || 4.2 || 4.4 || 13
|-
! scope="row" style="text-align:center" | 2008
|style="text-align:center;"|
| 7 || 21 || 4 || 5 || 238 || 267 || 505 || 77 || 77 || 0.2 || 0.2 || 11.3 || 12.7 || 24.0 || 3.7 || 3.7 || 7
|- style="background-color: #EAEAEA"
! scope="row" style="text-align:center" | 2009
|style="text-align:center;"|
| 7 || 18 || 5 || 4 || 199 || 243 || 442 || 95 || 76 || 0.3 || 0.2 || 11.1 || 13.5 || 24.6 || 5.3 || 4.2 || 7
|- class="sortbottom"
! colspan=3| Career
! 306
! 83
! 80
! 3858
! 2472
! 6330
! 1232
! 875
! 0.3
! 0.3
! 12.6
! 8.1
! 20.7
! 4.0
! 2.9
! 72
|}

Coaching statistics

Honours and achievements

Playing honours
Team
AFL Premiership (North Melbourne): 1996, 1999
McClelland Trophy (North Melbourne): 1998
Pre-Season Cup Winner (North Melbourne): 1995, 1998

Individual
All-Australian: 2002
Syd Barker Medal: 2002
North Melbourne F.C. Captain: 2004–2008
International Rules Team: 2002, 2003
AFL Rising Star Nominee:1996

Coaching honours
Team
AFL Premiership (West Coast): 2018
Individual
Jock McHale Medal: 2018
All-Australian: 2018

Personal life
Simpson married his high-school sweetheart, whom he met in Year 11, and he has four children.

References

External links 

1976 births
Living people
North Melbourne Football Club players
North Melbourne Football Club Premiership players
Syd Barker Medal winners
All-Australians (AFL)
Australian rules footballers from Victoria (Australia)
Northern Knights players
Eltham Football Club players
West Coast Eagles coaches
West Coast Eagles Premiership coaches
Australia international rules football team players
All-Australian coaches
Two-time VFL/AFL Premiership players
One-time VFL/AFL Premiership coaches
People from the City of Banyule